Chong Samran station is a railway station located in Wa Tabaek Subdistrict, Thep Sathit District, Chaiyaphum Province.

References 

Railway stations in Thailand
Chaiyaphum province